Senator Jones may refer to:

People named Senator Jones
Senator Nolan Jones (1934–2008), American record executive

Members of the Australian Senate
Gerry Jones (politician) (1932–2017), Australian Senator from Queensland from 1981 to 1996

Members of the Canadian Senate
George Burpee Jones (1866–1950), Canadian Senator from New Brunswick from 1935 to 1950
John Walter Jones (1878–1954), Canadian Senator from Queens County, Prince Edward Island from 1953 to 1954
Lyman Melvin Jones (1843–1917), Canadian Senator from Toronto, Ontario from 1901 to 1917

Members of the Jamaican Senate
Winston V. Jones (born 1917), Jamaican Senator

Members of the United States Senate
Andrieus A. Jones (1862–1927), U.S. Senator from New Mexico from 1917 to 1927
Charles W. Jones (1834–1897), U.S. Senator from Florida from 1875 to 1887
Doug Jones (politician) (born 1954), U.S. Senator from Alabama from 2018 to 2021
George Jones (U.S. senator) (1766–1838), U.S. Senator from Georgia in 1807
George Wallace Jones (1804–1896), U.S. Senator from Iowa from 1848 to 1859
James C. Jones (1809–1859), U.S. Senator from Tennessee from 1851 to 1857
James Kimbrough Jones (1839–1908), U.S. Senator from Arkansas from 1885 to 1903
John P. Jones (1829–1912), U.S. Senator from Nevada from 1873 to 1903
Wesley Livsey Jones (1863–1932), U.S. Senator from Washington from 1909 to 1932

United States state senate members

California State Senate
Albert F. Jones (fl. 1880s–1890s)
Brian Jones (politician) (born 1968)

Florida State Senate
Daryl Jones (politician) (born 1955)
Dennis L. Jones (born 1941)

Georgia State Senate
Burt Jones (fl. 1990s–2010s)
Emanuel Jones (born 1959)
Harold V. Jones II (born 1969)

Illinois State Senate
De Garmo Jones (1787–1846)
Emil Jones (born 1935)
Emil Jones III (born 1978)
John O. Jones (born 1940)
Wendell E. Jones (1937–2011)

Maryland State Senate
Spencer Cone Jones (1836–1915)
Verna L. Jones (born 1955)

Missouri State Senate
A. Clifford Jones (1921–1996)
Lem T. Jones Jr. (1924–1995)
Paul C. Jones (1901–1981)
W. Claude Jones (died 1884)

New York State Senate
Addison P. Jones (1822–1910)
John Patterson Jones (1779–1858)
John Jones (doctor) (1729–1791)
Mary Ellen Jones (politician) (born 1936)
Nathaniel Jones (representative) (1788–1866)
Samuel A. Jones (1861–1937)
Samuel Jones (New York comptroller) (1734–1819)

North Carolina State Senate
Abraham Jones (North Carolina politician) (fl. 1770s–1780s)
Edward Jones (North Carolina politician) (1950–2012)
Hamilton C. Jones (1884–1957)
Joseph Jones (North Carolina politician)
Walter B. Jones Sr. (1913–1992)
Willie Jones (statesman) (1740–1801)

Ohio State Senate
Benjamin Jones (congressman) (1787–1861)
Shannon Jones (born 1970)

South Dakota State Senate
Chuck Jones (politician) (born 1971)
Tom Jones (South Dakota politician) (born 1940)

Virginia State Senate
Charles Pinckney Jones (1845–1914)
James A. Jones (1820–1894)

Washington State Senate
J. H. Jones (Washington politician) (1857–1934)
Jesse S. Jones (1860–1931)
John D. Jones (Washington politician) (1923–2014)

Wisconsin State Senate
Alfred M. Jones (1837–1910)
Evan O. Jones (1830–1915)
Hugh M. Jones (1892–1978)
John H. Jones (American politician) (1836–1875)

Other states
Donna Jones (Idaho politician) (born 1939), Idaho State Senate
Frank Fernando Jones (1855–1941), Iowa State Senate 
George R. Jones (1862–1936), Massachusetts State Senate
George Washington Jones (Tennessee politician) (1806–1884), Tennessee State Senate
Guy H. Jones (1911–1986), Arkansas State Senate
H. Kent Jones (1926–1995), North Dakota State Senate
Henry Cox Jones (1821–1913), Alabama State Senate
John D. Jones (Minnesota politician) (1849–1914), Minnesota State Senate
Justin Jones (politician) (born 1974), Nevada State Senate
Leander P. Jones (1847–1908), Connecticut State Senate
Llew Jones (born 1962), Montana State Senate
Lloyd Jones (politician) (born 1937), Alaska State Senate
Matt Jones (American politician) (born 1950s), Colorado State Senate
Patricia W. Jones (born 1950), Utah State Senate
Ray Jones (Kentucky politician) (born 1969), Kentucky State Senate
Rick Jones (politician) (born 1952), Michigan State Senate
Roxanne Jones (1928–1996), Pennsylvania State Senate
Sherman Jones (1935–2007), Kansas State Senate
Walter H. Jones (New Jersey politician) (1912–1982), New Jersey State Senate

Fictional characters
E. H. Jones, a character in the 1944 biographical film Wilson
Senator Jones, a character in the 1976–1977 television miniseries Rich Man, Poor Man Book II
Senator Jones, a character in the 2012 concept album The Only Solution

See also
Senator Floyd-Jones (disambiguation)
Senator Jonas (disambiguation)